The Natural Farmer is a magazine publication based in the Northeastern United States that covers agricultural topics for farmers. The magazine is owned by Northeast Organic Farming Association and is headquartered in Barre, Massachusetts. In 1988 Jack Kittredge became the editor of the magazine.

References

External links
 Official website

Agricultural magazines
Agriculture in the United States
Quarterly magazines published in the United States
Magazines with year of establishment missing
Magazines published in Massachusetts
Northeastern United States
Barre, Massachusetts